Mineral Township is one of twenty-five townships in Bureau County, Illinois, USA. As of the 2020 census, its population was 477 and it contained 241 housing units.

The township was named for its nearby coal deposits.

Geography

Cities
 Mineral
 Sheffield (west quarter)

Cemeteries
The township contains Mineral Cemetery.

Major highways
  Interstate 80
  US Route 6
  US Route 34

Airports and landing strips
 Edwin G Bennett Airport

Landmarks
 Hennepin Canal Parkway State Park (south quarter)

Demographics
As of the 2020 census there were 477 people, 207 households, and 144 families residing in the township. The racial makeup of the township was 94.34% White, 1.47% African American, 0.21% Native American, 0.00% Asian, 0.00% Pacific Islander, 0.21% from other races, and 3.77% from two or more races. Hispanic or Latino of any race were 0.84% of the population.

There were 207 households, out of which 33.80% had children under the age of 18 living with them, 56.52% were married couples living together, 7.25% had a female householder with no spouse present, and 30.43% were non-families. 26.10% of all households were made up of individuals, and 13.50% had someone living alone who was 65 years of age or older. The average household size was 2.42 and the average family size was 2.89.

The township's age distribution consisted of 21.2% under the age of 18, 10.0% from 18 to 24, 23.2% from 25 to 44, 30.4% from 45 to 64, and 15.4% who were 65 years of age or older. The median age was 41.0 years. For every 100 females, there were 115.0 males. For every 100 females age 18 and over, there were 104.7 males.

The median income for a household in the township was $46,319, and the median income for a family was $57,500. Males had a median income of $38,472 versus $18,438 for females. The per capita income for the township was $23,194. About 7.6% of families and 7.7% of the population were below the poverty line, including 18.0% of those under age 18 and 2.6% of those age 65 or over.

School districts
 Annawan Community Unit School District 226
 Bureau Valley Community Unit School District 340
 Neponset Community Consolidated District 307

Political districts
 Illinois's 11th congressional district
 State House District 74
 State Senate District 37

References
 
 US Census Bureau 2007 TIGER/Line Shapefiles
 US National Atlas

External links
 City-Data.com
 Illinois State Archives

Townships in Bureau County, Illinois
Populated places established in 1849
Townships in Illinois
1849 establishments in Illinois